Defenders of Riga is a 2007 Latvian feature film directed by Aigars Grauba starring Elita Kļaviņa, Jānis Reinis, and Artūrs Skrastiņš. The film depicts the Latvian defense of Riga in November 1919 during its War of Independence. It was selected as the Latvian entry for the Best International Feature Film at the 81st Academy Awards, but was not nominated.

With a budget of over 2 million lats, Defenders of Riga was the most expensive Latvian film at the time.

Cast

Reception 

Five weeks after the premiere it had been viewed by 262,000 people, making it the most-watched film in Latvia since the regaining of independence.

Awards and nominations

Production 

The shooting of the film began in the spring of 2004. The outdoor scenes were shot at the 8.5 hectare Cinevilla backlot in Tukums, Latvia, where parts of Riga's Old Town and Riga's Pārdaugava district were built especially for Defenders of Riga. Around 200 extras took part in the film's battle scenes. It was the first Latvian film to make an extensive use of special effects and computer graphics.

References

External links
 
 Official international trailer (In English)

2007 films
Latvian drama films
Films set in Latvia
Films set in Riga
Films directed by Aigars Grauba
Films shot in Latvia
Films set in 1919